Tabriz International Book Fair is an annual international book fair held in Tabriz, East Azerbaijan, Iran. Held in Tabriz International Exhibition Center, the event also provides an opportunity for publishers to discuss future cooperation. In terms of number of domestic and foreign publishers contract after than Tehran International Book Fair. Perennial Tabriz International Book Fair visits more than 750,000.

13th edition is 2015

See also

Media of Iran
Culture of Iran
Education in Iran
Iran International Exhibitions Company
Intellectual property in Iran
Tehran International Book Fair

Notes

References
 
 

Book fairs in Iran
Iranian culture
Tabriz
Tourist attractions in Tabriz